Mangu is a Local Government Area in Plateau State, Nigeria.

It has an area of 1,653 km and a population of 294,931 at the 2006 census.

They occupy the districts of Panyam, Pushit, Kerang, Mangun, Kombun, Ampang West, and the local government headquarters (Mangu). Other ethnic groups include the Jipal (found in Kaper, Katul, Kabum, Rundum, Kanjing, Bul, Male, Zwagal, Kwa, Kaburuk, Koplar and Dungning.) Pyem (found in Gindiri). The Chakfem People and the Kwanka or Kadung people inhabiting the northeastern in Kadunung.

Mangu local government also host the Factory of Nigeria's first and most cherished bottle water; SWAN Spring Water, located at the foot of the Kerang Volcanic Mountains.

The postal code of the area is 932.

References

Local Government Areas in Plateau State